"Suga Mama" is a song from Beyoncé Knowles's B'Day album.

Suga Mama may also refer to:
 "Suga Mama", a song by Fifth Harmony from their debut album Reflection
 Suga Mama, the all-female backing band for Beyoncé.
 Suga Mama Proud, a character on the animated series The Proud Family.
Sugar mama

See also
 Sugar Mama (disambiguation)